Finnish passports are issued to nationals of Finland for the purpose of international travel. Aside from serving as proof of Finnish nationality, they facilitate the process of securing assistance from Finnish consular officials abroad (or other EU consulates or Nordic missions in case a Finnish consular official is absent). 

Finnish passports share the standardised layout and burgundy-red cover with other EU countries. Passports are issued by the local police or by an authorised Finnish diplomatic mission abroad. 

Men who are less than 30 years of age and consequently eligible for military service, but have not completed it, may only be issued a passport with an expiration date up to the last legal start date for completion of the obligation, which is at the age of 28. Men older than 30 can receive a passport with normal expiry dates regardless of the status of completion of the military duty.

Every Finnish citizen is also a citizen of the European Union. The passport, along with the national identity card allows for free rights of movement and residence in any of the states of the European Union, European Economic Area and Switzerland. For travel within the Nordic countries no identity documentation is legally required for Nordic citizens due to the Nordic Passport Union.

The passport cards are currently printed and customised by Thales Group.

Physical appearance
From 1996, Finnish passports have had burgundy-coloured covers and use the standard European Union passport layout, with the Finnish Coat of arms emblazoned in the centre of the front cover. The words "Euroopan unioni" (Finnish) and "Europeiska unionen" (Swedish) meaning "European Union"  are inscribed above the coat of arms, and the words "Suomi – Finland", the country's name in Finnish and Swedish, and "Passi – Pass", meaning "Passport" in Finnish and Swedish, below. In older non-biometric EU passports issued prior to August 2006, the words were entirely in capital letters, but current versions use mixed case. Biometric passports, first issued on 21 August 2006, also have the standard biometric symbol at the top. In 2012, the coat of arms was enlarged and the European Union title was shifted below it and separated by a double line from the country's name which is now in all capitals. The biometric symbol has been moved to the bottom. The inside pages contain drawings of an moose that when flipped rapidly show the moose in motion. The cover is embossed with a snowflake motif.

Visa requirements

In 2022, Finnish citizens had visa-free or visa on arrival access to 189 countries and territories, ranking the Finnish passport third in the world (tied with Italian and Luxembourgish passports) according to the Henley Passport Index. Additionally, Arton Capital's Passport Index ranked the Finnish passport second in the world, with a visa-free score of 172 (tied with Austrian, Dutch, French, German, Italian, Luxembourgish, Spanish, Swedish, Swiss, and United States passports), as of 19 September 2022.

As a member state of the European Union, Finnish citizens enjoy freedom of movement within the European Economic Area (EEA). The Citizens’ Rights Directive defines the right of free movement for citizens of the EEA. Through bilateral agreements freedom of movement is extended to Switzerland, and all EU and EFTA nationals are not only visa-exempt but are legally entitled to enter and reside in each other's countries.

Different spellings of the same name
Names containing special letters (ä, ö, å) are spelled the correct way in the non-machine-readable zone, but are mapped in the machine-readable zone, ä becoming AE, ö becoming OE, å becoming AA. 
For example, Hämäläinen → HAEMAELAEINEN.

History
Finnish passports issued from the 1930s until the 1970s had a white paper cover with the bearer's photograph and the seal of the province where the bearer applied for his or her passport affixed on the back cover. Those issued from the 1970s until the adoption of the EU design in 1996 had a dark blue leather cover and did not contain the "European Union" texts, but were otherwise broadly similar in appearance. Previously, children could be included in the parents' passport, but this is no longer allowed and children must be issued their own passport, regardless of age.

Åland 
Åland, being an autonomous region with its own Government, has a separate passport. The Åland Islands passport does not however indicate a different nationality, with all holders being Finnish citizens. Unlike the Danish autonomous countries (none of which belong to the European Union) the Åland Islands autonomous region is a full part of the Finnish state, and an Åland Islands passport therefore brings all the rights and benefits of European Union membership for the holder. The passport follows the standard European Union format, and is marked on the front cover with both Finland and Åland.

See also
 Visa requirements for Finnish citizens
 Passports of the European Union

References 

Finland
Passport
European Union passports